The season 1993–94 of Segunda División B of Spanish football started August 1993 and ended May 1994.

Summary before the 1993–94 season 
Playoffs de Ascenso:

 Leganés (P)
 Salamanca
 Toledo (P)
 Getafe
 Alavés
 Barakaldo 
 Gimnástica de Torrelavega
 Palencia
 Murcia (P)
 Sant Andreu
 Elche
 Hércules (P)
 Las Palmas 
 Xerez
 Granada
 Jaén

Relegated from Segunda División:

 Figueres
 Lugo
 Sestao
 Sabadell

Promoted from Tercera División:

 Langreo (from Group 2)
 Arosa (from Group 1)
 SS Reyes (from Group 7)
 Real Madrid C (from Group 7)
 Touring (from Group 4)
 Utebo (from Group 16)
 Real Unión (from Group 4)
 Bermeo (from Group 4)
 Gramenet (from Group 5)
 Premià (from Group 5)
 Manacor (from Group 11)
 Cieza (from Group 13)
 Málaga (from Group 9)
 Almería  (from Group 9)
 Talavera (from Group 17)
 Mármol Macael (from Group 9)
 Realejos  (from Group 12)

Relegated:

 As Pontes
 Valdepeñas
 Aranjuez
 RSD Alcalá
 Hernani
 Zaragoza B
 Elgoibar
 Santurtzi
 Torrevieja
 Orihuela
 Llíria
 Sporting Mahonés
 Horadada
 Betis B
 Linense
 Marino
 Portuense

Administrative relegation:
 Ibiza (financial trouble)

Occupied the vacant spots by administrative relegations:
 Rubí (occupied the vacant spot of Ibiza)

Group I
Teams from Asturias, Castile and Leon, Castilla–La Mancha, Galicia and Madrid.

Teams

League table

Results

Top goalscorers

Top goalkeepers

Group II
Teams from Aragon, Basque Country, Cantabria, Castile and Leon, La Rioja and Navarre.

Teams

League Table

Results

Top goalscorers

Top goalkeepers

Group III
Teams from Andorra, Balearic Islands, Catalonia, Region of Murcia and Valencian Community

Teams

League Table

Results

Top goalscorers

Top goalkeepers

Group IV
Teams from Andalusia, Canary Islands, Extremadura and Melilla.

Teams

League Table

Results

Top goalscorers

Top goalkeepers

Play-offs

Group A

Group B

Group C

Group D

Play-out

Semifinal

Final

External links
Futbolme.com

 
Segunda División B seasons
3

Spain